Calospeira is a genus of  dictyostelids, a type of slime molds.

References

External links 

 
 Calospeira at biolib.cz
 Calospeira at Mycobank

Amoebozoa genera
Mycetozoa